The 1999–2000 daytime network television schedule for the six major English-language commercial broadcast networks in the United States in operation during that television season covers the weekday daytime hours from September 1999 to August 2000. The schedule is followed by a list per network of returning series, new series, and series canceled after the 1998–99 season.

Affiliates fill time periods not occupied by network programs with local or syndicated programming. PBS – which offers daytime programming through a children's program block, which the service rebranded as PBS Kids on September 6 – is not included, as its member television stations have local flexibility over most of their schedules and broadcast times for network shows may vary. Also not included are stations affiliated with Pax TV; although Pax carried a limited schedule of first-run programs, its schedule otherwise was composed mainly of syndicated reruns.

Legend

Schedule
 New series are highlighted in bold.
 All times correspond to U.S. Eastern and Pacific Time scheduling (except for some live sports or events). Except where affiliates slot certain programs outside their network-dictated timeslots, subtract one hour for Central, Mountain, Alaska, and Hawaii-Aleutian times.
 Local schedules may differ, as affiliates have the option to pre-empt or delay network programs. Such scheduling may be limited to preemptions caused by local or national breaking news or weather coverage (which may force stations to tape delay certain programs in overnight timeslots or defer them to a co-operated or other contracted station in their regular timeslot) and any major sports events scheduled to air in a weekday timeslot (mainly during major holidays). Stations may air shows at other times at their preference.

Monday-Friday

Notes:
 ABC, NBC and CBS offer their early morning newscasts via a looping feed (usually running as late as 10:00 a.m. Pacific Time) to accommodate local scheduling in the westernmost contiguous time zones or for use a filler programming for stations that do not offer a local morning newscast; some stations without a morning newscast may air syndicated or time-lease programs instead of the full newscast loop.
 NBC allowed owned-and-operated and affiliated stations the preference of airing Passions and Days of Our Lives in reverse order from the network's recommended scheduling, a structure held over from when Another World occupied the 2:00 p.m. ET timeslot prior to its discontinuance in July 1999.
 Sunset Beach aired its final episode on December 31, 1999; NBC returned the noon timeslot to its affiliates on January 3, 2000. Some NBC affiliates did not air Sunset Beach in the noon timeslot, opting to air local news and/or syndicated programming instead.
 UPN debuted a weekly Disney cartoon block called Disney's One Too. It debuted on Monday, September 6th, 1999 (just a day after UPN Kids aired its final broadcast). UPN airs Disney animated series from Disney's One Saturday Morning on ABC, except it airs Monday through Friday afternoons and Sunday mornings (except Saturdays).

Saturday

Sunday

By network

ABC

Returning series:
ABC World News This Morning
ABC World News Tonight
All My Children
The Bugs Bunny and Tweety Show 
Disney's One Saturday Morning
Doug
Recess
Pepper Ann
General Hospital
Good Morning America
Mickey Mouse Works
The New Adventures of Winnie the Pooh 
One Life to Live
Port Charles
Schoolhouse Rock! 
Squigglevision
The View

New series:
Sabrina: The Animated Series
The Weekenders

Not returning from 1998–99:
101 Dalmatians: The Series 
Good Morning America Sunday 
Hercules

CBS

Returning series:
Anatole
As the World Turns
The Bold and the Beautiful
CBS Evening News
CBS Morning News
CBS This Morning
CBS News Saturday Morning
CBS News Sunday Morning
Face the Nation
Flying Rhino Junior High
Guiding Light 
Mythic Warriors
The Price Is Right
The Young and the Restless

New series:
Blaster's Universe
The Early Show
New Tales from the Cryptkeeper
Rescue Heroes
The Saturday Early Show

Not returning from 1998–99:
Birdz
Dumb Bunnies
Franklin (moved to Nick Jr.)
Rupert 
Tales from the Cryptkeeper

NBC

Returning series:
City Guys
Days of Our Lives
Hang Time
NBA Inside Stuff
NBC Nightly News
One World
Passions
Saved by the Bell: The New Class
Sunset Beach
Today

New series:
Early Today
Later Today

Not returning from 1998–99:
Another World
NBC News at Sunrise

Fox

Returning series:
Digimon: Digital Monsters
Fox News Sunday
Godzilla: The Series
The Magic School Bus 
Power Rangers Lost Galaxy
Power Rangers Power Playback
The New Woody Woodpecker Show 
X-Men  (moved from UPN)

New series:
Action Man
Angela Anaconda
The Avengers: United They Stand
Beast Machines: Transformers
Beast Wars: Transformers
Big Guy and Rusty the Boy Robot
Cybersix
Dinozaurs
Escaflowne
Dungeons & Dragons 
Flint the Time Detective
Monster Rancher
NASCAR Racers
Power Rangers Lightspeed Rescue
Sherlock Holmes in the 22nd Century
Spider-Man Unlimited
Xyber 9: New Dawn

Not returning from 1998–99:
Bobby's World 
Cartoon Cabana
Donkey Kong Country
Goosebumps
Life with Louie
Mad Jack the Pirate
The Magician
The Mr. Potato Head Show
Mystic Knights of Tir Na Nog
Ned's Newt
The New Addams Family
Oggy and the Cockroaches
Power Rangers in Space
The Secret Files of the Spy Dogs
Space Goofs
Spider-Man
Toonsylvania
Young Hercules

UPN

New series:
Doug
Hercules
Pepper Ann
Recess
Sabrina: The Animated Series

Not returning from 1998–99:
Algo's FACTory
Beetleborgs 
Incredible Hulk and Friends (reruns of The Incredible Hulk, Fantastic Four and Iron Man)
X-Men  
Spider-Man

The WB

Returning series:
Batman Beyond
The Big Cartoonie Show
Histeria!
Men in Black
The New Batman/Superman Adventures
Pokémon
The Sylvester & Tweety Mysteries

New series:
Cardcaptors
Detention
Max Steel

Not returning from 1998–99:
Animaniacs
Brats of the Lost Nebula
Invasion America
Pinky and the Brain
Pinky, Elmyra & the Brain
Tiny Toon Adventures

See also
1999–2000 United States network television schedule (prime-time)
1999–2000 United States network television schedule (late night)

References

Sources
 
 
 
 
 
 

United States weekday network television schedules
1999 in American television
2000 in American television